Montagu may refer to:

 Montagu (surname)

Titles of nobility 
 Duke of Montagu
 Marquess of Montagu
 John Neville, 1st Marquess of Montagu (c. 1431 – 1471), Yorkist leader in the Wars of the Roses 
 Baron Montagu of Beaulieu
 Baron Montagu of Boughton
 Montagu Baronets, alternate name for the Baron Swaythling

Places 
 Montagu, Western Cape, South Africa
 Montagu Island, in the Southern Ocean
 Montagu Bay, Tasmania, a suburb of Hobart
 Montagu, Tasmania, a rural locality
 West Montagu, Tasmania, a rural locality
 Montagu - country just under Australia - rural

Ships 
 , 74-gun third rate ship of the line launched in 1779 and broken up in 1818
 , Duncan-class battleship launched in 1901 and wrecked in 1906

Other uses 
 Ashley Montagu Resolution, petition to the World Court to end the genital modification and mutilation of children
 Montagu C. Butler Library, major collection of items in and about Esperanto
 Montagu (clothing)
 Montagu's harrier, migratory bird of prey of the harrier family
 Montagu–Chelmsford Reforms, the basis of the Government of India Act 1919
 Montagu Private Equity

See also 
 
 
 Montagu House (disambiguation)
 Montaign
 Montaigne (disambiguation)
 Montaigu (disambiguation)

ja:モンタギュー